Viper is a wooden roller coaster located at Six Flags Great America in Gurnee, Illinois, which opened in 1995. Viper is a clone of the Coney Island Cyclone and is the only roller coaster ever to be built directly by Six Flags. Viper is also the only wooden roller coaster with this name (all other roller coasters named Viper, both operating and not, have been steel roller coasters). It was built by Rygiel Construction.

History

In 1994, Six Flags Great America announced that they would be adding Viper. It would be a wooden roller coaster scheduled to open for the 1995 season. Construction of the coaster began in the fall of 1994 and was completed in early 1995. Viper opened on April 29, 1995.

Throughout the years, Viper's queue has undergone numerous modifications to accommodate additions such as the addition of Raging Bull directly south of the ride and the former entrance to the adjacent Hurricane Harbor water park directly west of the ride. Unlike most clones of the Coney Island Cyclone, Viper provides a much smoother ride than the original attraction.

During its first year of operation, Viper was part of Hometown Square. With the opening of Southwest Territory in 1996, Viper was officially made part of Southwest Territory, where it and Raging Bull are the anchor attractions.

On May 24, 2013, the park announced that Viper would be one of three coasters running backwards for the first time during 2013 season for a limited time along with Batman: The Ride and American Eagle.

Ride experience 

Riders enter Viper from Southwest Territory. After winding through an outdoor queue passing under parts of Raging Bull, guests enter the station and board the 30-passenger PTC trains, each composed of five three-bench cars that seat six riders each. These trains are the same model as the trains on American Eagle, but painted green to resemble a snake.

Layout 

Upon leaving the station, trains make a slight left hand turn, followed by a straight segment of track. This leads into another left hand turn and trains then climb the  lift hill. At the top, the track drops at a 53-degree angle. The maximum speed may vary between 50 and 55 miles per hour (80 and 88 km/h) depending on the weather conditions, time of day and the load. Next the train rises into a right hand turn around. This turn around leads to a sharp second drop, before rising over another hill and passing through a left hand second turn around. The second turn around has a double down element as riders descend another drop into the wooden structure. The ride makes another out and back run, and after the final turn around, hits the brake run, ending the ride.

Viper's overall layout is a mirror image of the Coney Island Cyclone, however, the approach to the lift hill is much longer and the final turn leads into a straight brake run leading directly into the station. The second turn around also is a direct gradual ascent, peaking at the middle, before leading into a double down drop.

Awards

Note: Viper has not charted in the Golden Ticket Awards since 2014.

Incidents 
On June 25, 1997 a 14-year-old Waukegan boy injured his arm while dangling it outside the car. His limb got caught between the car and the platform as the ride reentered the station and slowed to a stop.

See also 

Georgia Cyclone, a wooden roller coaster at Six Flags Over Georgia, also a mirror image version of the Coney Island Cyclone.
Texas Cyclone, at the defunct Six Flags Astroworld, also was a mirror image of the Coney Island Cyclone.
Psyclone, at Six Flags Magic Mountain, was a mirror image of Viper, the Georgia Cyclone, and Texas Cyclone, and demolished in 2007.

References 

Roller coasters in Illinois
Roller coasters operated by Six Flags
Six Flags Great America
Roller coasters introduced in 1995